Withington is a tram stop on the South Manchester Line (SML) of Greater Manchester's light-rail Metrolink system. It is located on the west side of Princess Road on the fringe of Withington in south Manchester, England.

The tram stop was opened on 23 May 2013. It was built in a cutting on a section of abandoned railway which was re-opened for light rail operation. The line was originally opened in 1880 by the Cheshire Lines Committee as the Manchester South District Line, which ran trains from Manchester Central railway station. The line was closed in 1967, but was re-opened in the 21st century as part of the Metrolink network.

History

In 1880, the Midland Railway, in partnership with the Cheshire Lines Committee, opened its new Manchester South District Line out of Manchester Central Station. After Chorlton-cum-Hardy railway station, the line ran south-east through the area with no stations until Withington railway station on the corner of Lapwing Lane and Palatine Road (Withington station was renamed Withington & Albert Park in 1884 and then Withington & West Didsbury in 1915). Withington & West Didsbury station closed in July 1961, although British Rail trains continued to use this route until 1969, when the entre line was closed as part of the Beeching cuts.

In 1984, Greater Manchester Council and GMPTE announced the Project Light Rail scheme to develop a new light rail/tram system by re-opening use of disused railway lines in the region, including the route from Chorlton to East Didsbury. The first phase of the Manchester Metrolink system opened in 1992, but the East Didsbury line was not included.

Tram tracks were laid along the former trackbed, and a new intermediate tram stop was constructed by the Princess Road bridge next to Hough End Playing Fields. Withington Metrolink stop opened on 23 May 2013. Further south along the line, the original Withington railway station was not re-opened, but was replaced with a new Metrolink stop, in close proximity to the old station site.

Location
Withington tram stop is situated on Princess Road in the Hough End area of Manchester, between Withington and Chorlton-cum-Hardy. It serves Hough End Playing Fields and Southern Cemetery, as well as the residential area to the east of Princess Road.

The choice of name has been criticised by local residents, who consider it to be incorrect. The surrounding area was historically considered to be part of Withington.

Service pattern 

Gallery

See also
Withington railway station for other stations named Withington

References

External links

 Metrolink stop information
 Withington area map
 Withington Metrolink station plans

Tram stops in Manchester
Railway stations in Great Britain opened in 2013
Manchester South District Line
Tram stops on the East Didsbury to Rochdale line
Withington